Silene keiskei is a species of flowering plant in the  family Caryophyllaceae. The species is native to Japan (Honshu).

The species was first described and the name by Friedrich Anton Wilhelm Miquel but in 1936 it was reconsidered and reclassified by Jisaburo Ohwi. Plants in this species can grow up to 10 to 30 cm.

Subspecies 
subspecies include:

 Silene keiskei f. albescens 
 Silene keiskei var. minor 
 Silene keiskei f. procumbens

References 

keiskei